Modern Combat 5, also known as Modern Combat 5: Blackout is a 2014 first-person shooter developed by Gameloft Bucharest and published by Gameloft. It is the fifth installment of the Modern Combat series and the sequel to Modern Combat 4: Zero Hour. It was released on July 24, 2014 for iOS, Android, Windows Phone 8, Windows 8.1 and BlackBerry 10, on October 24, 2018 for Windows via Steam, and for Nintendo Switch on February 14, 2019. It is the first game in the series that is developed by Gameloft Bucharest.

Plot

The World Liberation Army, a terrorist organization, had attacked Venice to steal chemical weapons held by the United Nations. Cayden Phoenix (a minor character in Modern Combat 4), a former US Marine now freelancing as a private military contractor for Gilman Security corporation, had been sent on a mission when World Liberation Army (WLA) had launched a surprise attack on Venice, Italy to steal chemical weapons secretly stashed in Venice by the United Nations, followed by a cyber-attack on several Asian networks a week after. His teammate was Jonathan Taylor ("Bull"), a former US Special Forces operative dismissed under suspicion of selling classified weapons and information to terrorist groups.

Next, Phoenix tries to convince Roux that the WLA attack on Venice was actually a cover-up orchestrated by Gilman Security themselves for something greater, but Roux is reluctant to believe him. Phoenix also reveals that Gilman has become aware of his prying around into their business and blackmailed him into signing off on the mission report by threatening harm against his daughter Lily.

The campaign continues one month later, with Phoenix waking up in a hospital gown in Rinnoji Temple, Japan. It is revealed that one month ago Tokyo was rocked by a massive chemical weapons attack using the chemical weapons from the mission in Venice, with the entire city now on lockdown. The temple has been converted into a makeshift hospital for refugees of the attack but has now fallen under the control of the Raiders, a powerful street gang who have been using the chaos in Tokyo created by the attack to loot and expand their power.

Phoenix escapes safely from the temple grounds with the aid of a nurse and confidante of Roux Miku Kubo and meets up with Isaac Tukura and Andrews, who have been sent by Roux to rescue him. The group then heads by truck to Roux's safe house in downtown Tokyo.

En route to the safe house, the group's truck is ambushed by Raiders - as well as Gilman Security hover drones which, due to the city lockdown, have been designated to fire on any moving target in their area. Phoenix attempts to hold the hostiles off using a 50 cal. mounted machine gun, but the truck is eventually flipped; Andrews is killed in the wreck, while Tukura manages to drag Phoenix away from the wreckage to safety. Tukura and Phoenix venture into the city on foot and commandeer a van from the Raiders which they use to reach the safehouse, where they Rendezvous with Roux, Alex Hawk, and other members of Roux's team.

Roux orders the team members to take defensive positions as Raiders have begun to converge on the safe house, with Phoenix manning a sniper rifle on a balcony. However, an Apache helicopter hijacked by Raiders launches a rocket at the building, causing Phoenix to fall safely to a lower floor. Phoenix along with Roux and Hawk, eventually manage to repel the Raiders from the safe house, with Hawk and Phoenix then heading out to deploy electronic jammers in the vicinity as defence against the Gilman Security hover drones.

After securing the safe house, Roux and Phoenix meet at Roux's office, where Phoenix resumes their earlier conversation about Gilman Security's involvement in the attack on Venice. Roux informs Phoenix that she has reported him as killed in action to Gilman superiors to keep his daughter safe in the meantime. Roux plays audio she managed to intercept between Bull and international terrorist Everett Saunders (an antagonist from Modern Combat 4). In conversation, Bull reveals himself as having been on Saunders' payroll during the Venice mission, and the pair arrange a meeting at a construction site in Ryogoku, Tokyo to discuss Bull's pay as well as plans for a "Phase 2". As the conversation ends, Bull threatens that if he doesn't receive his pay, he plans to reveal that Saunders is actually running Gilman Security under the alias of CEO Kirk Bancroft. After this revelation, Roux and Phoenix make plans to spy on the meeting between Bull and Saunders to learn more about "Phase 2", but first Phoenix requests that Roux let him explain the true events which occurred in Venice.

The game then cuts to another flashback in which Phoenix further describes the events of the mission in Venice. Phoenix and Bull are en route via helicopter over the Piazza San Marco in Venice with the mission of securing "The Package" from the WLA terrorists, a cache of chemical weapons being stored in Venice by the UN. Their chopper is attacked by WLA helicopters, killing their gunner. Phoenix mans the machine gun to hold off the hostiles, and he and Bull are dropped off and sent to retrieve the Package before the WLA can steal it. Phoenix manages to shoot down a helicopter with a SAM missile just in the nick of time to prevent it from escaping with the package, while he and Bull make their way to the crash site, and deploy a hover drone to defend the area against the converting WLA hostiles.

The team eventually rendezvous with an Apache helicopter which retrieves the package, while another chopper clears a landing zone on the Plaza for Phoenix' extraction. However as Phoenix is extracted, the chopper is suddenly attacked by a hostile chopper, throwing Phoenix into the canal, where Bull rescues him by boat. Bull and Phoenix escape across the canal while pursued by a WLA attack chopper, with Bull calling off "Operation Strikezone", declaring the Package secure and requesting a new extraction.

The flashback concludes with Phoenix explaining the nature of the cover-up in Venice. The WLA were actually under the control of Gilman Security the entire time, with the attack on Venice having been staged by the higher-ups of Gilman Security in order to provide cover to steal the chemical weapons being stored in Venice by the UN under the ruse of a terrorist attack, with Bull having been under orders to retrieve the weapons and eliminate all opposition.

The weapons stolen from Venice were later detonated on Tokyo by Gilman during the International Summit on Cyber Security, which ironically was formed in response to a cyberattack on Asian networks which Gilman themselves was likely involved with as well; with Gilman using these attacks to try to start a major world war.

Phoenix, along with Hawk and Turkura enter the main lobby of Gilman HQ, while Roux assists the team with a sniper rifle from an adjacent building. Upon entering the HQ, the team notices that the building has already been attacked by Raiders. The team eliminates the Gilman forces guarding the lobby and make their way higher up the building by an external elevator; however, the elevator is attacked by hover drones, which causes Hawk to lose his footing and fall to his death.

Tukura and Phoenix make their way to the HQ's computer mainframe and hack the system, retrieving evidence of Gilman's involvement in recent terrorist attacks, and make their way to the roof to be extracted by chopper after the Gilman response team begins shooting the computer power cells. On the roof, Saunders contacts Phoenix by radio and taunts him, threatening his daughter Lily, and attacks the team in an Apache helicopter, however, Saunders' chopper is temporarily chased off by the Apache sent for the teams' extraction.

Phoenix and Tukura manage to clear a landing zone for chopper extraction, but after Phoenix approaches the chopper, Saunders' chopper re-emerges and shoots down the extracting chopper; Phoenix angrily retaliates by shooting the pilot of Saunders' chopper with his pistol, causing it to crash into the roof. Saunders then emerges from the wreckage and prepares to shoot Phoenix, but Phoenix manages to wrestle the gun away and plunges Saunders' own knife into his throat, killing him.

The plot concludes with a conversation between Roux and Phoenix sometime after the previous events. Phoenix reveals his daughter Lily is safe, and that he is with her now, while Roux reveals that the information retrieved from Gilman HQ has led to the arrest of high-ranking Gilman and UN officials involved in the conspiracy, and has been used to link Gilman to terrorist organizations in the Middle East. After Gilman's involvement in terrorist attacks was uncovered, the UN removing them from Tokyo and the region has since re-stabilized, As the two conclude their conversation, however, Roux suddenly receives an important email regarding an urgent assignment, with the plot ending on a cliffhanger.

Gameplay 
Gameplay in Modern Combat 5: Blackout is similar to previous entries in the series. The player can shoot, crouch, sprint, throw grenades, aim, reload their weapons, leap over obstacles, knife enemies, change/pick up weapons, and use abilities supported by the equipped class. A new key feature to Modern Combat 5 is the ability to choose soldier classes ranging from Assault, Heavy, Sniper, Recon, Support, Bounty Hunter, Sapper, X-1 Morph, Kommander, and Marauder. Each of which has its own different perks and weapons), although a player's class does not prevent the player from picking up different classes' weapons in-game.  As the player continues in certain classes and acquires a "weapon score", new guns and attachments to use in both the campaign and multiplayer are unlocked. Modern Combat 5 is the first Modern Combat game in the series to use DRM and requires a constant internet connection to play (an internet connection is required for the campaign as well as multiplayer).

One major change in the campaign of Blackout, compared to previous Modern Combat titles, is that the missions are shorter. A mission can last five to ten minutes, noticeably shorter than missions of previous entries. Modern Combat 5: Blackout also introduces allies, characters who follow along with the player, often joining in during conflicts.

Like Zero Hour, the campaign missions in Modern Combat 5: Blackout vary in style. The game is primarily a first person shooter, but missions include controlling turrets on boats, helicopters, and even drones.

Multiplayer 
The multiplayer of Modern Combat 5 is similar to other first-person shooters. The weapons carry over from player's campaigns. Players can also form "squads", a feature new to the Modern Combat series. Another new feature is Private Chat, which allows chat between squad members. Currently there are 7 modes: Free For All, Team Battle, VIP, Capture the Flag, Rush, Zone Control and Cargo. There are 9 maps, ranging from canals in Venice and construction sites to office maps and military hangars. There is also a battle royale mode which was added to the game in beta mode after update 27.

Reception

The game was met with mostly positive reviews from critics. The iOS version holds an aggregate score of 79 out of 100 on Metacritic based on 17 reviews. Reviewers praised the game's visuals and sound but criticized the slow-paced gameplay and performance issues. A review by TechRadar explains that the campaign is impersonal. Its review was 3.5 out of 5 stars. However another review by GamesLover, explained that the campaign is too repetitive and boring, giving the game one out of five.

Notes

References

2014 video games
Android (operating system) games
BlackBerry games
Dystopian video games
First-person shooter multiplayer online games
Science fiction shooter video games
Gameloft games
IOS games
Multiplayer video games
Multiplayer and single-player video games
Nintendo Switch games
Science fiction video games
Terrorism in fiction
Video games developed in Romania
Video games set in the 2040s
Video games set in Italy
Video games set in the future
Video games set in Japan
Video games set in Tokyo
Video games set in Venice
Windows games
Windows Phone games
Battle royale games